The 2016 Sibiu Cycling Tour took place between July 6 and July 10, after a one-week delay due to local elections. It opened with the traditional prologue and for the first time featured a mountain time trial to Bâlea Lac. It featured four pro-continental teams, including, for the first time, a British team, ONE Pro Cycling.

It was won by Nikolay Mihaylov after he was part of a breakaway on Stage 2. It was notable for its first Romanian stage winner, Andrei Nechita, who won the opening prologue; and for its first Australian stage winner, Steele von Hoff.

Teams

Route and stages

References

External links
 

Sibiu Cycling Tour
2016 in Romanian sport
Cycle races in Romania